Parmar is a Rajput clan found in Northern and Central India, especially in Rajasthan, Punjab, Haryana, Kutch, Uttarakhand, Uttar Pradesh, Bihar, Madhya Pradesh and North Maharashtra. The name is also used by Kōḷīs, Garoḍās, Līmaciyā Valands, Mōcīs, Tūrīs, Luhārs, Kansārās, Darajīs, Bhāvasārs, Cūnvāḷiyās, Ghañcīs, Harijans, Sōnīs, Sutārs, Dhobīs, Khavāsas, Rabārīs, Āhīrs, Sandhīs, Pīñjārās, Vāñjhās, Dhūḷadhōyās, Rāvaḷs, Vāgharīs, Bhīls, Āñjaṇās, and Ḍhēḍhs.

See also 
 Paramara Dynasty
 Panwar Dynasty

References 

Rajput clans
Agnivansha
Rajput clans of Uttarakhand